Mihály Bakos, also known in Slovene as Miháo Bakoš or Mihael Bakoš, ( 1742 – 9 April 1803) was a Hungarian Slovene Lutheran priest, author, and educator.

He was born in a Slovene-speaking family in the village of Šalovci, in the Habsburg Kingdom of Hungary, today in the Prekmurje region of Slovenia. His parents were Ferenc Bakos and Éva Ábraham. In 1779, he became a pastor in Surd, then part of the County of Somogy (now in Zala County). In the 17th and 18th centuries, numerous Slovene families from the Slovene March settled in Somogy. Many of them were Lutheran, and so Slovene-language services were set up for them. Bakos' predecessor was István Küzmics, a Slovene writer that translated the New Testament into his local Prekmurje dialect.

Between 1784 and 1785, Bakos served as a pastor in Križevci (Hungarian Tótkeresztúr), in Prekmurje. He later returned to Somogy, where he served as the dean for Somogy and Zala counties. In 1791, he wrote the Slovene hymnal  (Christian Hymnal).

See also
Slovenes in Somogy
List of Slovene writers and poets in Hungary

References
 Anton Trstenjak. 2006. Slovenci na Ogrskem [Hungarian Slovenes], Maribor: Pokrajinski arhiv. 

Slovenian writers and poets in Hungary
18th-century Hungarian male writers
Slovenian writers
Slovenian Lutheran clergy
1740s births
1803 deaths
People from Šalovci